The 2000–01 Arkansas Razorbacks men's basketball team represented the University of Arkansas in the 2000–01 college basketball season. The head coach was Nolan Richardson, serving for his 16th year. The team played its home games in Bud Walton Arena in Fayetteville, Arkansas.

Schedule

|-
!colspan=9| John Thompson Foundation Challenge Classic

|-
!colspan=9| Regular Season

|-
!colspan=9| 2001 SEC men's basketball tournament

|-
!colspan=9| NCAA Tournament – West Region

Source:

References

Arkansas
Arkansas
Arkansas Razorbacks men's basketball seasons
Razor
Razor